Cipriano Barata, also known as Cipriano José Barata de Almeida (26 September 1762 – 7 June 1838) was a Brazilian physician and politician who was in favor of Brazilian independence. He was a founding member of a Masonic Lodge, "The Knights of the Light Shop." He was also a journalist who started a newspaper in Portugal called Sentinel of Liberty.

Early life and education
Barata was born in Bahia, Brazil in 1762. Barata graduated from the University of Coimbra, where he studied surgery, philosophy and mathematics and was introduced to Enlightenment ideas that were popular in academia at the time.

Career and political activity
Together with professor Francisco Muniz Barreto and others, he was a member of the first Masonic Lodge in Brazil, the "Knights of the Light Shop", founded in Salvador in 1797. The following year, he attended the casting Bahia, being held by legal authorities afterward. Some say that he was the editor of the Manifesto to the People from Bahia, which urged the people to revolt. He gained prominence as a member of a movement, Conjuração Baiana, that wanted independence for Brazil and the end of slavery. In 1800, he was arrested and released for his alleged involvement. After this point, he became a cane farmer in the town of Abrantes (current Camaçari) and continued practicing as a doctor. 

Barata fled to Portugal in 1832. Shortly after his arrival he started a newspaper called Sentinela da Liberdade (Sentinel of Liberty).

References

Citations

Bibliography
MILK, Renato Lopes. Republicans and Libertarians. Radical thinkers in Rio de Janeiro (1822). Rio de Janeiro: Brazilian Civilization, 2000.
SODRÉ, Nelson Werneck. The history of the press in Brazil. Rio de Janeiro: Brazilian Civilization, 1966.
Vianna, Helium. Contribution to the History of the Brazilian Press (1812–1869). Rio de Janeiro: National Press, 1945. 664p.

1762 births
1838 deaths
19th-century Brazilian physicians
Brazilian politicians
People from Salvador, Bahia
University of Coimbra alumni